The Executive Council of Prince Edward Island (informally and more commonly, the Cabinet of Prince Edward Island) is the cabinet of that Canadian province.

Almost always made up of members of the Legislative Assembly of Prince Edward Island, the Cabinet is similar in structure and role to the Cabinet of Canada while being smaller in size.  As federal and provincial responsibilities differ there are a number of different portfolios between the federal and provincial governments.

The Lieutenant-Governor of Prince Edward Island, as representative of the King in Right of Prince Edward Island, heads the council, and is referred to as the Governor-in-Council. Other members of the Cabinet, who advise, or minister, the vice-regal, are selected by the Premier of Prince Edward Island and appointed by the Lieutenant-Governor. Most cabinet ministers are the head of a ministry, but this is not always the case.

As at the federal level the most important Cabinet post after that of the leader is the Minister of Finance, which in Prince Edward Island is referred to as the Provincial Treasurer.  The second most powerful position in the provincial cabinet is typically the health portfolio since it occupies in excess of 40% of the province's annual budget.  Other portfolios with moderate influence include Transportation and Public Works, as well as resource-dependent ministries such as Agriculture or Fisheries.

Current cabinet
The current cabinet is formed from the caucus of the Progressive Conservative Party of Prince Edward Island with most taking the oath of office on May 9, 2019. A minor cabinet shuffle occurred on February 21, 2020.

Members are listed in order of precedence.

References

External links
 Cabinet of Prince Edward Island